Frank Barry was an Australian rules footballer who played with South Adelaide in the South Australian Football League (SAFL) from 1911 to 1915.

A rover, Barry was a joint winner of the Magarey Medal in his final league season. The war caused the competition to be suspended from 1916 to 1918 and he didn't return in 1919. He finished with just 41 games for South Adelaide but will forever be part of their history as he was their first Magarey Medallist. Barry also represented South Australia twice at interstate football.

External links

South Adelaide Football Club players
Magarey Medal winners
Year of birth missing
Year of death missing
Place of birth missing
Australian rules footballers from South Australia